The 1886 Kansas gubernatorial election was held on November 2, 1886. Incumbent Republican John Martin defeated Democratic nominee Thomas Moonlight with 54.74% of the vote.

General election

Candidates
Major party candidates 
John Martin, Republican
Thomas Moonlight, Democratic

Other candidates
C. H. Brancombe, Prohibition

Results

References

1886
Kansas
Gubernatorial